Philip M. Parker (born June 20, 1960) is an American economist and academic, currently the INSEAD Chaired Professor of Management Science at INSEAD in Fontainebleau, France. He has patented a method to automatically produce a set of similar books from a template which is filled with data from database and Internet searches. He claims that his programs have written more than 200,000 books.

Early life 
Born dyslexic, Parker early on developed a passion for dictionaries. He gained undergraduate degrees in finance and economics. He received a Ph.D. in business economics from the Wharton School of the University of Pennsylvania and has master's degrees in finance and banking from Aix-Marseille University and managerial economics from Wharton.

Work

He was a professor of economics and business at University of California, San Diego before moving to INSEAD, where he has been a professor of marketing since 1988. His work focuses primarily on macroeconomics.

Books on economics
Parker has written six books on national economic development and economic divergence. His books argue that consumer utility and consumption functions should be bounded by physical laws and against economic axioms which violate laws of physics such as conservation of energy.
 Climatic Effects on Individual, Social and Economic Behavior, Greenwood Press, 1995
 Cross-Cultural Statistical Encyclopedia of the World, Greenwood Press, 1997. A four-volume encyclopedia, which recasts international national economic statistics of the world into linguistic, religious, and ethnic groups.
 Physioeconomics: The Basis for Long-Run Economic Growth. MIT Press, 2000. This forecasts global economic and demographic trends to the year 2100: he concludes that long-run economic convergence between different cultural groups is unlikely. He provides an explanation of why distance from the equator matters in economic development. His explanation of the equatorial paradox is based on the following:
as the distance from the equator increases, the angle of the sun is smaller and the average temperature goes down, and one's exposure to natural sunlight diminishes;
 to survive in places distant from the equator, people had to learn and master how to produce clothes, food, etc., to survive, not for luxury;
 from this point of view, GDP is heavily weighted as an indicator of natural misery of the environment one lives in;
 by mastering methods to survive over centuries humans in the higher latitudes accumulated more knowledge and physical technologies to produce goods;
 as populations increased, social technologies (institutions, law, etc.) developed as adaptive mechanisms;
 these social technologies and cultural traits enabled reproduction of social and physical technologies over centuries of increasing cumulative social, cultural, and physical capital.

Online reference works
Parker is also involved—as entrepreneur publisher and editor—in new media reference work projects. He is the creator of  Webster's Online Dictionary: The Rosetta Edition, a multilingual online dictionary created in 1999. It uses the "Webster's" name, which is now in the public domain. This site compiles different online dictionaries and encyclopedia including the Webster's Revised Unabridged Dictionary (1913), Wiktionary, and Wikipedia.

In 2021, Parker was reported to be working on a multilingual "content engine" project named Botipedia, designed to use natural language learning and algorithmic search engine sifting to fill the translation gap for web content. This would enable speakers of minority languages to view web content in their own language.

Automatically generated books
Most of Parker's automatically generated books target niche markets (the "long tail" concept). Examples include:

Books series on medical subjects published by Icon Health Publications and coauthored with James N. Parker. The Official Patient's Sourcebook series deals with classic diseases like spinal stenosis or autoimmune hepatitis. The 3-in-1 Medical Reference series deals with general medical topics like hemoglobin.
A series on the future demand for certain products in certain regions in the world, largely consisting of tables and graphs, published by his company Icon Group International, Inc. One book, The 2009-2014 World Outlook for 60-milligram Containers of Fromage Frais, won the 2008 Bookseller/Diagram Prize for Oddest Title of the Year.
A series on cross-language crossword puzzle books, e.g. Webster's English to Italian Crossword Puzzles: Level 1, and thesauri, e.g. Webster's Quechua – English Thesaurus Dictionary published by Icon Group International, Inc. Some of these titles raised concerns with linguists who claimed inaccuracies and ownership/citation rights in certain languages covered in these volumes. Parker removed the concerned titles from print stating that he had not known that anyone claimed intellectual property rights over languages.
A series of quotation collections subtitled Webster's Quotations, Facts and Phrases, each volume assembling quotations which feature a specific English word. Excerpts are drawn from public domain literary sources and reference works, and from Wikipedia articles (identified as "WP" after a quotation). The English professor Nicholas Royle noted that Veering: Webster's Quotations, Facts and Phrases contained quotations unrelated to the word "veering" or using "Veer" only as a proper name; he described the book as "quite bizarre" and "absurdly expensive".

All books are self-published paperbacks. Ninety-five percent of the ordered books are sent out electronically; the rest are printed on demand. Parker plans to extend the programs to produce romance novels.

Digital poetry
Using a collection of automation programs called "Eve", Parker has applied his techniques within his dictionary project to digital poetry; he reports posting over 1.3 million poems, aspiring to reach one poem for each word found in the English language. He refers to these as "graph theoretic poems" since they are generated using graph theory, where "graph" refers to mathematical values that relate words to each other in a semantic web. He has posted in the thesaurus section of his online dictionary the values used in these algorithms. The poems are in a wide variety of styles, including some invented by Parker himself. His poems are didactic in nature, and either define the entry word in question, or highlight its antonyms. He has stated plans to expand these to many languages and is experimenting with other poetic forms.

See also

Books LLC
Racter
VDM Publishing

References
Notes

Further reading
 Abrahams, Marc (January 29, 2008).  "Speed WritingTake a Leaf Out of Philip M Parker's Book", The Guardian.  Retrieved February 24, 2012.
 Abrahams, Marc (February 4, 2008).  "Automatic WritingFurther Volumes of Philip M Parker".  The Guardian.  Retrieved February 24, 2012.

External links
Faculty page at INSEAD

Video of Phil Parker explaining his software
Philip M. Parker's poetry site written using computer algorithms
Philip M. Parker's anagram site with anagrams found in natural language strings

Place of birth missing (living people)
1960 births
Living people
American non-fiction writers
21st-century American economists
American expatriates in France
American publishers (people)
Academic staff of INSEAD
Wharton School of the University of Pennsylvania alumni
Electronic literature writers